Brendan Canty (born 17 January 1992) is an Australian former professional road racing cyclist, who rode professionally between 2015 and 2018 for Team Budget Forklifts,  and . Following his retirement, Canty became a financial analyst for international education company EF Education First.

Major results

2015
 1st Stage 3a (ITT) Tour de Beauce
 7th Overall Herald Sun Tour
2016
 2nd  Road race, Oceania Road Championships
 7th Overall Tour of Oman
1st  Young rider classification
 8th Overall Tour of Austria
1st Stage 3
2017
 National Road Championships
6th Time trial
7th Road race
2018
 9th Road race, National Road Championships

Grand Tour general classification results timeline

References

External links

1992 births
Living people
Australian male cyclists
Cyclists from Melbourne
People from Frankston, Victoria
Sportsmen from Victoria (Australia)